Mutharam (A) is a village and mandal in Karimnagar district in the state of Telangana in India.

References 

Villages in Karimnagar district